Skyfox II: The Cygnus Conflict is a space combat computer game developed by Dynamix and published by Electronic Arts in 1987 for the Commodore 64 as a sequel to the original Skyfox for the Apple II. It was ported to the Amiga, Atari ST, and MS-DOS. The creator of Skyfox, Ray Tobey,  was not involved in this game.

Gameplay

Reception
Computer Gaming World stated that Skyfox II had good graphics, much action, and diverse and interesting weapons for fans of space-combat games. In a 1994 survey of wargames the magazine gave the title one-plus stars out of five. The game was reviewed in 1988 in Dragon #133 by Hartley, Patricia, and Kirk Lesser in "The Role of Computers" column. The reviewers gave the game 4 out of 5 stars.

Reviews
The Games Machine - Mar, 1988
The Games Machine - Aug, 1988
ASM (Aktueller Software Markt) - Feb, 1988
The Games Machine - Aug, 1989
ST Format - Aug, 1989
Computer Gaming World - Jun, 1991

References

External links

Skyfox II at Atari Mania
Skyfox II at Amiga Hall of Light
Review in Family Computing
Review in Info

1987 video games
Amiga games
Atari ST games
Commodore 64 games
DOS games
Dynamix games
Electronic Arts games
Single-player video games
Space combat simulators
Video game sequels
Video games developed in the United States